The 2021 West Coast Conference men's basketball tournament was the postseason men's basketball tournament for the West Coast Conference during the 2020–21 NCAA Division I men's basketball season. The tournament was held from March 4 through March 9, 2021 at the Orleans Arena in Paradise, Nevada. Gonzaga won the tournament, giving it the conference's automatic bid to the 2021 NCAA tournament, in the process becoming the 16th team to enter the Division I tournament unbeaten. For the third consecutive year, the Los Angeles-based University Credit Union was the title sponsor of the tournament.

Venue 
For the thirteenth consecutive year, the 2021 WCC Tournament was held in the Orleans Arena. When the Orleans Arena is set up for basketball games, the seating capacity is 7,471. The tournament is scheduled to be held at the Orleans Arena at least until 2022. The Orleans Arena is located at the 1,886 room Orleans Hotel and Casino about 1 mile west of the Las Vegas Strip. The tickets for the WCC Tournament typically sell out quickly. Due to the COVID-19 pandemic, no fans were permitted to attend this tournament.

Seeds 
All 10 WCC schools were eligible to participate in the tournament. Teams are typically seeded by conference record, with a tiebreaker system used to seed teams with identical conference records. However, due to numerous regular-season game cancellations, the WCC announced on February 16 that the seeding for the 2021 edition would be determined using an adjusted conference winning percentage. Developed in partnership with Ken Pomeroy, the adjusted conference winning percentage takes into account the strength of the opponent and the location where each game was played. The final report was released on February 28. 

The tournament followed a format similar to that used from 2003 to 2011. The 7 through 10 seeds played in the "first round", the 5 and 6 seeds started play in the "second round", and the 3 and 4 seeds started in the "quarterfinals". The top two seeds received byes into the semifinals.

Schedule

Bracket 

* denotes overtime period

See also 

 2021 West Coast Conference women's basketball tournament
 West Coast Conference men's basketball tournament

References 

2021 in sports in Nevada
2020–21 West Coast Conference men's basketball season
West Coast Conference men's basketball tournament
Basketball competitions in the Las Vegas Valley
College basketball tournaments in Nevada
College sports tournaments in Nevada